Victor Township is a civil township of Clinton County in the U.S. state of Michigan. The population was 3,460 at the 2010 census.

Communities
Lake Victoria is an unincorporated community and census-designated place located in the northeast portion of the township.

Geography

Victor Township is located in eastern Clinton County and is bordered by Shiawassee County to the east. Larger water bodies in the township include Round Lake, Lake Victoria, and Lake Ovid, which is part of Sleepy Hollow State Park. The Looking Glass River, a tributary of the Grand River, flows from east to west across the southern part of the township.

Demographics
As of the census of 2000, there were 3,275 people, 1,139 households, and 930 families residing in the township. The racial makeup of the township was 97.65% White, 0.43% African American, 0.18% Native American, 0.06% Asian, 0.67% from other races, and 1.01% from two or more races. Hispanic or Latino of any race were 1.74% of the population.

There were 1,139 households, out of which 40.7% had children under the age of 18 living with them, 73.3% were married couples living together, 5.2% had a female householder with no husband present, and 18.3% were non-families. 14.8% of all households were made up of individuals, and 3.7% had someone living alone who was 65 years of age or older.  The average household size was 2.87 and the average family size was 3.20.

In the township the population was spread out, with 29.1% under the age of 18, 5.6% from 18 to 24, 31.0% from 25 to 44, 27.3% from 45 to 64, and 7.0% who were 65 years of age or older.  The median age was 38 years. For every 100 females, there were 101.0 males.  For every 100 females age 18 and over, there were 99.9 males.

The median income for a household in the township was $59,375, and the median income for a family was $64,356. Males had a median income of $42,413 versus $30,703 for females. The per capita income for the township was $24,353.  About 1.3% of families and 2.0% of the population were below the poverty line, including none of those under age 18 and 9.5% of those age 65 or over.

Notable person
James H. Robinson, Medal of Honor recipient during the American Civil War

References

External links
Victor Township official website

Townships in Michigan
Townships in Clinton County, Michigan
Lansing–East Lansing metropolitan area
Populated places established in 1836
1836 establishments in Michigan Territory